Bulbophyllum comosum is a species of orchid.

comosum
Plants described in 1890